, real name , is a Japanese singer, lyricist, and voice actress from Osaka. The majority of her work is dealt with adult visual novels. She was also the singer for all the vocal music in Key's visual novel Little Busters!, as well as Liar-soft's "Steampunk" series.

Discography
Mjuka (December 28, 2011)
meaning (August 13, 2010—78 pre-sale copies)
mighty (November 11, 2009)
magnetism (January 21, 2009)
motion (December 7, 2007)
Little Busters Original Soundtrack (September 28, 2007)
multiple (May 30, 2007)
 (December 29, 2006)
 (April 6, 2005)
 (April 6, 2005)
 (August 15, 2003)
Rita's Hour04

GWAVE 2013 2nd Progress
GWAVE SuperFeature's vol.3 "Mermaid Kiss"

Voice roles
Little Busters! and Kud Wafter as A-chan
Cross Channel as Nanaka
Kindred Spirits on the Roof as Koba Youka
SNOW as Asahi
Yume Miru Kusuri: A Drug That Makes You Dream as Misaki

References

External links
 
 Lantis page
 

Living people
People from Osaka
Anime singers
Japanese women singers
Japanese voice actresses
Lantis (company) artists
Musicians from Osaka Prefecture
Japanese lyricists
Video game musicians
Year of birth missing (living people)